Tân Tiến may refer to:

Tân Tiến, Bắc Giang, Vietnam
Tân Tiến, Bắc Kạn, Vietnam
Tân Tiến, Bình Phước, capital of Bù Đốp District
Tân Tiến, Cà Mau, Vietnam
Tân Tiến, Biên Hòa, a ward in Đồng Nai province